Herman Solberg Nilsen (born 30 April 1999) is a Norwegian footballer who plays for Fram, on loan from Sandefjord.

Career
He started his youth career in Nanset IF. In the summer of 2018 he was loaned out from Sandefjord to crisis-stricken third-tier club IF Fram Larvik. The loan continued in 2019. 2020-season he was loaned out to Kongsvinger. Solberg Nilsen did only play 5 matches for Kongsvinger. In 2021 he returned to his hometown on a loan to club Fram Larvik.

References

1999 births
Living people
People from Larvik
Norwegian footballers
Eliteserien players
Sandefjord Fotball players
IF Fram Larvik players
Kongsvinger IL Toppfotball players
Norway youth international footballers
Association football forwards
Sportspeople from Vestfold og Telemark